The balloon frogs are a small genus of microhylid frogs from South Asia.

Balloon frog may also refer to:

 Assamese balloon frog, a frog found in northeastern India
 Glyphoglossus molossus, a frog found in Cambodia, Laos, Myanmar, Thailand, and Vietnam